Jacques Rivette, le veilleur (English: Jacques Rivette, the nightwatchman) is a 1990 French television documentary film directed by Claire Denis and Serge Daney. Chronicling the life of film critic and director Jacques Rivette, it is an episode of the long running French TV show Cinéma, de notre temps, which profiles the lives of film directors. It was directed by Denis, with Daney acting as the interviewer. It was made in 1990and first broadcast on Arte on 24 February 1994. It is broken up into two parts: Le Jour (70 minutes) and La Nuit (54 minutes).

Participants
 Jacques Rivette
 Serge Daney
 Bulle Ogier
 Jean Babilée
 Jean-François Stévenin

Reception
Travis Mackenzie Hoover wrote that the documentary portrays Rivette with "lonerish tendencies" and as "a sort of transient with no home or country, wandering about or loitering in public space instead of staking out some personal terra firma."

References

External links 
 
 Jacques Rivette, le veilleur at AlloCiné

1990 television films
1990 films
1990 documentary films
Films directed by Claire Denis
1990s French-language films
Films set in France
Jacques Rivette
French documentary films
1990s French films